The Normal Heart is a 2014 American television drama film directed by Ryan Murphy and written by Larry Kramer, based on his 1985 play of the same name. The film stars Mark Ruffalo, Matt Bomer, Taylor Kitsch, Jim Parsons, Alfred Molina, Joe Mantello, Jonathan Groff, and Julia Roberts.

The film depicts the rise of the HIV-AIDS crisis in New York City between 1981 and 1984, as seen through the eyes of writer/activist Ned Weeks (Ruffalo), the founder of a prominent HIV advocacy group. Weeks prefers public confrontations to the calmer, more private strategies favored by his associates, friends, and closeted lover Felix Turner (Bomer). Their differences of opinion lead to arguments that threaten to undermine their shared goals.

It was released on DVD and Blu-ray on August 26, 2014.

Plot
It is summer of 1981. Ned (Alexander) Weeks (Mark Ruffalo) is an openly gay writer from New York City who travels to Fire Island via Long Island to celebrate the birthday of his friend Craig Donner (Jonathan Groff) at a beach house. Other friends in attendance include Mickey Marcus (Joe Mantello) and the charismatic Bruce Niles (Taylor Kitsch), who has recently begun dating Craig, who is young and appears to be in good health. While walking on the beach, however, Craig feels dizzy and collapses. Later, when blowing out the candles on his birthday cake, Craig begins to cough repeatedly.

While traveling back to New York City, Ned reads an article in the New York Times titled "Rare Cancer Diagnosed in 41 Homosexuals". Back in the city, he visits the offices of Dr. Emma Brookner (Julia Roberts), a physician who has seen many patients afflicted with symptoms of rare diseases that normally would be harmless unless their immune systems had been compromised. All of these cases seem to be appearing in gay men. In the waiting room, Ned meets Sanford (Stephen Spinella), a patient whose face and hands are marked with skin lesions caused by Kaposi's sarcoma, a rare cancer. Brookner examines Ned, but finds that he does not have the symptoms of this disease. She asks Ned to help her raise awareness of this disease within the gay community.

Craig suddenly suffers violent convulsions and is rushed to the hospital with Ned, Mickey, and Bruce where he is later pronounced dead. Brookner recognizes Bruce, noting that he is the former boyfriend of another one of her patients who recently died. Ned organizes a gathering at his home where many local gay men are invited to hear Brookner share information about the disease. Though she lacks conclusive evidence, she states her belief that the illness is sexually transmissible and that they should all avoid having sex for the time being to prevent new transmissions. Most attendees question her belief. She notes that few medical journals appear interested in publishing anything on this disease which is mostly affecting homosexual men. Ned announces that he wants to start an organization to spread information about the disease and provide services to those who have been infected.

Brookner and Ned visit a local hospital where several of her sick patients are in critical condition with an illness that is now being referred to as gay-related immune deficiency (GRID). They stay in rooms that many hospital staff are afraid to enter for fear of contracting the disease. Ned, Bruce, Mickey, and several other friends including Tommy Boatwright (Jim Parsons) establish a community organization called Gay Men's Health Crisis (GMHC). The organization sponsors fundraisers for research on the disease now called AIDS and establishes a telephone hotline, counseling, and other services. Over Ned's objections, they elect Bruce their president. Ned arranges for his older brother, lawyer Ben Weeks (Alfred Molina), to provide free legal advice to the GMHC. The two brothers are close, but there remains an underlying tension over Ben's lack of understanding of Ned's sexuality. Ned contacts gay New York Times reporter Felix Turner (Matt Bomer), hoping that he can use his media connections to publish more stories about the unfolding health crisis. Felix laments that it is difficult getting any mainstream newspapers to report much information on AIDS. After Felix recalls that he and Ned had a sexual tryst at a gay bathhouse, the two begin a romantic relationship.

The disease continues to spread and claim lives. Bruce attempts to travel to Phoenix with his boyfriend Albert (Finn Wittrock), who is dying, so that Albert can see his mother one more time. The airline refuses at first to fly the plane with sick Albert on board. When they do eventually get to Phoenix, Albert dies following a period of dementia. The hospital doctors refuse to examine him and issue a death certificate, and instead throw him out with the garbage while Bruce bribes a funeral home to cremate his body without a death certificate.

Brookner attempts to obtain grant money to continue researching AIDS, but her efforts are rejected by government officials who do not see AIDS as a priority. Ned, meanwhile, is kicked out of GMHC for his combative and aggressive tactics to promote awareness of AIDS, which is causing tension within the group.

Felix comes down with symptoms and his body wastes away as the disease claims his life. Felix arranges for a will with the help of Ben, and leaves everything he has to Ned. The two state their love for one another at the hospital before Felix dies. A few days later, Ned visits his alma mater, Yale University, where a Gay Week is being hosted by the students. He admires how young men and women are able to dance with one another openly, without fear of discrimination.

Information is displayed about the growing number of people developing AIDS, as Tommy's Rolodex pile (the contact info of his friends who have died from AIDS) grows bigger, eventually including Bruce Niles.

Cast

 Mark Ruffalo as Alexander "Ned" Weeks (alter ego for Larry Kramer)
 Ruffalo, who had a childhood friend who struggled with his homosexuality, first watched The Normal Heart play in 1986. When Ruffalo was initially offered the part of Ned in the film, he argued that a gay actor should have the role, but accepted it when Murphy insisted.
 Matt Bomer as Felix Turner (based on John Duka) 
 Taylor Kitsch as Bruce Niles (based on Paul Popham)
 Jim Parsons as Tommy Boatwright (based on Rodger McFarlane)
 Alfred Molina as Ben Weeks (based on Arthur Kramer)
 Julia Roberts as Dr. Emma Brookner (based on Dr. Linda Laubenstein)
 Joe Mantello as Michael R. "Mickey" Marcus
 BD Wong as Buzzy
 Jonathan Groff as Craig Donner
 Stephen Spinella as Sanford
 Finn Wittrock as Albert
 Denis O'Hare as Hiram Keebler
 Corey Stoll as John Bruno
 Danielle Ferland as Estelle
 Frank De Julio as Nick
 Adam B. Shapiro as Bella

Production
In August 2011, Ryan Murphy said in an interview with Deadline Hollywood that he had optioned The Normal Heart and intended to produce the film version, starring Mark Ruffalo "and maybe Julia Roberts". The Hollywood Reporter confirmed the film news in January 2012, adding Alec Baldwin, Matt Bomer, and Jim Parsons to the previously announced cast. In March 2013, Taylor Kitsch joined the cast. In April 2013, the casting of actors Jonathan Groff and Joe Mantello was announced. In May 2013, it was announced that Alfred Molina would be replacing Alec Baldwin. Both Parsons and Mantello had starred in the 2011 Broadway revival, although Parsons was the only actor to reprise his role.

Murphy stated that he created this film, despite the play from which it derives being written in the 1980s, due to fears that people born after the 1980s AIDS crisis would not remember its lessons. The main producers were HBO & Plan B (the Brad Pitt company).

Filming
Principal photography began on June 8, 2013, in New York City, New York. On July 12, the crew was spotted shooting the film in Little Italy. During the course of filming, production was temporarily suspended to allow some of the actors to change their physical appearances; Bomer lost 40 pounds to show the ravages of AIDS on his character.

Release
The Normal Heart debuted on HBO on May 25, 2014, after an earlier theatrical screening at the Inside Out Film and Video Festival in Toronto, Ontario, Canada on May 23, 2014.

Home media
The Normal Heart was released on DVD and Blu-ray on August 26, 2014.

Reception

Critical response
The film received widespread critical acclaim, with praise for Kramer's screenplay, its drama, moral messages, production values, and the performances of the cast.  Review aggregation website Rotten Tomatoes gives the film a score of 94% based on 50 reviews, with an average score of 7.72/10. The site's critics consensus reads: "Thanks to Emmy-worthy performances from a reputable cast, The Normal Heart is not only a powerful, heartbreaking drama, but also a vital document of events leading up to and through the early AIDS crisis." Metacritic, which assigns a weighted average score to reviews from mainstream critics, gives the film a score of 85 out of 100, based on 33 reviews, indicating "universal acclaim".

Peter Travers of Rolling Stone awarded the film with a 3.5/4 and praised the film, "Written, directed and acted with a passion that radiates off the screen, The Normal Heart is drama at its most incendiary, a blunt instrument that is also poetic and profound. As gay men in crisis, Taylor Kitsch, Jim Parsons and Joe Mantello (who played Ned onstage) all excel. But it's Kramer, still raging over what's not being done, who tears at your heart." Ellen Gray of the Philadelphia Daily News commended "And though the supporting cast members are all good (Parsons particularly so), it's Kramer's fury, channeled through Ruffalo's manic energy as the writer's alter-ego Ned Weeks, that keeps The Normal Heart beating and preserves a horrific bit of all too recent history not in amber, but in anger."

Murphy's direction received mixed reviews from critics. Brian Lowry of Variety criticized Murphy's direction and the story's transition from stage to screen: "Murphy being Murphy, he can't resist throwing in moments that drift toward an American Horror Story vibe, such as a subway sequence where dramatic lighting flashes in and out on a lesion-pocked face. The translation from stage to screen also yields speeches that probably played better live, although the director has for the most part opened up the Tony-winning material into movie form," although he particularly hailed The Normal Heart as "a character-oriented drama with theatrical talent and values that would face challenges finding much purchase at the modern-day multiplex. The result is a movie, for mostly better and sometimes worse, that wears its heart on its sleeve." Maureen Ryan of The Huffington Post also criticized Murphy's direction, writing: "But if you do watch the film, just be aware that every few minutes you may wish that someone — anyone — other than Murphy had directed it. Murphy is a self-indulgent director and not particularly rigorous or disciplined. He serves his own muse, not necessarily the needs of the material, and though it's a classic, Kramer's play is also unwieldy and outright clumsy at time."

TVLine named Bomer the "Performer of the Week" for his performance.

Accolades

See also

 2014 in American television
 And the Band Played On (1993) — An HBO film also regarding the early years of the HIV/AIDS crisis in the United States

References

External links
 
 
 
 
 

2014 in American television
2014 drama films
2014 LGBT-related films
2014 television films
2014 films
2010s English-language films
American films based on plays
American LGBT-related television films
Blumhouse Productions films
American drama television films
Films directed by Ryan Murphy (writer)
Films scored by Cliff Martinez
Films set in the 1980s
Films set in New York City
Films shot in New York City
Films with screenplays by Larry Kramer
Gay-related films
HBO Films films
HIV/AIDS in television
LGBT-related drama films
Plan B Entertainment films
Primetime Emmy Award for Outstanding Made for Television Movie winners
Television shows based on plays
Television Academy Honors winners
HIV/AIDS in American films
2010s American films